Roberto Lara was born in Tres Arroyos (province of Buenos Aires), Argentina May 23, 1927.  Died November 3, 1988. He was an Argentine musician.

Biography 
He began his musical studies at the age of 7 and spent the rest of his life as a professional guitarist.  

In Argentina he performed as a soloist in the most prestigious institutions, among them the theaters Colón, Cervantes, San Martín, Odeón.  With worldwide concerts as a soloist and as an accompanist, he traveled to Brazil, Mexico, France, Germany, Switzerland, Poland and Hungary.

References

20th-century Argentine musicians